Francis Island is an island which is irregular in shape,  long and  wide, lying  east-northeast of Choyce Point, off the east coast of Graham Land, Antarctica. It was discovered and photographed from the air by the United States Antarctic Service in 1940. It was charted in 1947 by the Falkland Islands Dependencies Survey (FIDS), who named it for S.J. Francis, a FIDS surveyor.

See also 
 List of Antarctic and sub-Antarctic islands

References

Islands of Graham Land
Bowman Coast